Yusmely García (born December 19, 1983 in Caracas, Venezuela) is a Venezuelan hurdler who represented her country in the 400 meter hurdles.

Career
García is the Venezuelan National champion of 400 m hurdles. She holds the record of 57.09 seconds, set at the Venezuelan Nationals.

Achievements

References

External links
 

1983 births
Living people
Venezuelan female hurdlers
South American Games gold medalists for Venezuela
South American Games bronze medalists for Venezuela
South American Games medalists in athletics
Competitors at the 2002 South American Games
Sportspeople from Caracas
21st-century Venezuelan women